Methylvanillylecgonine or vanillylmethylecgonine is a cocaine analog and metabolite of cocaine found in human urine (possibly with co-ingestion of vanillin-vanilla containing products, as a result of cleavage and binding in vivo but more probably the result of the same metabolic pathways by which vanillylmandelic acid is formed).

See also
 Salicylmethylecgonine
 Cocaethylene

References

Tropanes
Dopamine reuptake inhibitors
Stimulants
Local anesthetics
Methyl esters
Methoxy compounds